The 2022 TCR Italy Touring Car Championship will be the eighth season of the ITCC to run under TCR regulations and the 36th season since the national touring car series was revived in 1987 as the Campionato Italiano Turismo.

Calendar

Teams and Drivers

Results

Drivers' Championship 

Scoring systems

References

External links 
 

Italy
TCR Italy